Angela Alupei ( Tamaș, born 1 May 1972) is a Romanian Olympic rower, born in Bacău, Romania. She has been rowing since she was 17 years of age. When not competing, she is a police officer.

She, and her partner Constanța Burcică took the gold medal, at the 2000 and 2004 Olympic Games in the women's lightweight double sculls event. They also took first place at the Rowing World Cup twice in 2000, in Vienna, Austria and in Lucerne, Switzerland, and second place at the 2004 World Cup in Lucerne.

Achievements
 2000 Summer Olympics – Gold medal, Women's Lwt Double Sculls
 2004 Summer Olympics – Gold medal, Women's Lwt Double Sculls

References

External links
 
 
 
 

1972 births
Living people
Olympic gold medalists for Romania
Olympic rowers of Romania
Sportspeople from Bacău
Romanian police officers
Romanian female rowers
Rowers at the 1996 Summer Olympics
Rowers at the 2000 Summer Olympics
Rowers at the 2004 Summer Olympics
Olympic medalists in rowing
Medalists at the 2004 Summer Olympics
Medalists at the 2000 Summer Olympics
21st-century Romanian civil servants
21st-century Romanian women